This is a list of instruments used in microbiological sterilization and disinfection.

Instrument list

References

Microbiology equipment